Divorce: (or Divorcee) is a 2005 Indian Hindi-language  drama film directed by M. J. Ramanan as his first feature project, starring Jackie Shroff, Tannishtha Chatterjee, and Rajendranath Zutshi.  The film went into post-production in December 2004, National Film Awards,

Background
Director Ramanan denied that his film drew inspirations from Masoom, Akele Hum Akele Tum and Rahul, other projects which reflected the emotions of a neglected child, and stated that his sole inspiration came after reading a U.S. newspaper report about a youngster seeking a legal divorce from his parents on the grounds of neglect.   The film was shot between 9 February – 12 March 2004, and was submitted for consideration to the 52nd National Film Awards.

Synopsis
An 8-year-old kid, Pranav (Parth Dave), is the only son of a rich couple Sidharth (Sonu Sood) and Vaidehi (Mandira Bedi). Sidharth works for a Multinational Company as an officer whose job requires a lot of traveling. In a way, Sidharth is also obsessed with his job and, therefore, is unable to give any time to his child and wife. Vaidehi, on the other hand, is a highly skilled and a dedicated Media correspondent working for a private channel. She also faces the same problem of giving time to her child and husband. They are running with the mechanized professional objectives like any other conventional human beings of the contemporary age.

The end result is that Pranav misses out on his parents and becomes a victim of suppressed emotions. Meanwhile, Pranav gains the friendship of his neighbor, Jackie (Jackie Shroff), a loner. An advocate by profession, Jackie is also a hardcore alcoholic with a very cool and unconventional attitude towards life. This growing intimacy between the two of them creates insecurity in the minds of Sidharth and Vaidehi, who try various means to deviate Pranav, but their attempts make Pranav more intimate to Jackie. During one of Jackie's court sessions, Pranav accompanies Jackie to watch the proceedings. The case is about a divorce between a husband and a wife. Pranav asks the meaning for the word "divorce," and Jackie explains that it is a separation between two people who do not like each other. For the first time, Pranav asks whether he can get divorced from his parents since he does not like them.

Though Pranav did not mean what he said, Jackie is shocked and convinces Pranav against it. In another incident that follows, Shyam (Rajendranath Zutshi), a drug addict and a resident of the apartment building in which Pranav resides, commits suicide due to a failed relationship. Pranav understands from a depressed old man that suicide is "freedom from all worries." These incidents create an indelible mark in the mind of Pranav, who thereafter threatens Jackie that he would commit suicide if he was not getting a divorce from his parents. Jackie conveys the seriousness to his parents. Sidharth and Vaidehi plan come home early in turns, but they still do not address the actual problems of Pranav, who wants to share a lot with his parents. But as a result of the professional demands, Sidharth and Vaidehi start quarreling with each other for not sticking on to their plan.

Now Pranav decides to campaign for the divorce with all his heart. Jackie is unable to convince Pranav this time and agrees to take up the case on Pranav's behalf for granting the separation. As an outcome the Judge (Reema Lagoo) instructs the government to devise a new penal code to handle the case where the kid himself can file a complaint against his parents. The new penal code is created, and the final verdict by the Judge becomes the climax of the film.

Cast

 Parth Dave as Pranav Joshi
 Sonu Sood as Siddharth Joshi
 Mandira Bedi as Vaidehi Joshi
 Jackie Shroff as Jackie
 Tannishtha Chatterjee as Kamla
 Snehal Dabi as Raju
 Reema Lagoo as Judge
 Shri Vallabh Vyas as Veda
 Rajendranath Zutshi as Shyam
 Musthafa as Nimith

References

External links
 

2005 films
2000s coming-of-age drama films
2000s Hindi-language films
Indian coming-of-age drama films
Films about dysfunctional families
Films scored by Ilaiyaraaja
2005 directorial debut films
2005 drama films